The 1892 Michigan gubernatorial election was held on November 1, 1892. Republican nominee John T. Rich defeated Democratic candidate Allen B. Morse with 47.21% of the vote.

General election

Candidates
Major party candidates
John T. Rich, Republican
Allen B. Morse, Democratic
Other candidates
John W. Ewing, People's
John Russell, Prohibition

Results

References

1892
Michigan
Gubernatorial
November 1892 events